The Upper Freehold Regional School District is a regional public school district in Monmouth County, New Jersey, United States, which provides educational services to students in pre-kindergarten through twelfth grade from Allentown Borough and Upper Freehold Township. Millstone Township sends students to the district's high school as part of a sending/receiving relationship with the Millstone Township Schools.

As of the 2021–22 school year, the district, comprised of three schools, had an enrollment of 2,124 students and 176.2 classroom teachers (on an FTE basis), for a student–teacher ratio of 12.1:1.

The district is classified by the New Jersey Department of Education as being in District Factor Group "GH", the third-highest of eight groupings. District 
Factor Groups organize districts statewide to allow comparison by common socioeconomic characteristics of the local districts. From lowest socioeconomic status to highest, the categories are A, B, CD, DE, FG, GH, I and J.

The district participates in the Interdistrict Public School Choice Program at Allentown High School, having been approved on November 2, 1999, as one of the first ten districts statewide to participate in the program. Seats in the program for non-resident students are specified by the district and are allocated by lottery, with tuition paid for participating students by the New Jersey Department of Education.

History
Students from Plumsted Township had attended the district's high school as part of a sending/receiving relationship with the Plumsted Township School District prior to the passage of a referendum under which New Egypt High School was opened in September 2001 with an initial class of 100 students in ninth grade.

Schools 
Schools in the district (with 2021–22 enrollment data from the National Center for Education Statistics) are:
Newell Elementary School with 516 students in grades PreK-4
Kelly Huggins, Principal
Stone Bridge Middle School with 460 students in grades 5-8
Stefanie Folino, Principal
Allentown High School with 1,131 students in grades 9-12
Todd Pae, Principal

Administration
Core members of the district's administration are:
Mark Guterl, Superintendent
Nicole Petrone, Business Administrator / Board Secretary

Board of education
The district's board of education, comprised of nine members, sets policy and oversees the fiscal and educational operation of the district through its administration. As a Type II school district, the board's trustees are elected directly by voters to serve three-year terms of office on a staggered basis, with three seats up for election each year held (since 2012) as part of the November general election. The nine seats are allocated to the two constituent municipalities based on population, with five assigned to Upper Freehold Township and four to Allentown. A tenth member is appointed by Millstone Township to represent that district on the Upper Freehold Board of Education.

References

External links 
Upper Freehold Regional School District

Data for the Upper Freehold Regional School District, National Center for Education Statistics

Allentown, New Jersey
New Jersey District Factor Group GH
School districts in Monmouth County, New Jersey
Upper Freehold Township, New Jersey